Malaysia competed in the 1977 Southeast Asian Games as the host nation in Kuala Lumpur from 19 to 26 November 1977.

Medal summary

Medals by sport

Medallists

Football

Men's tournament
Group A 

Semifinal

Gold medal match

References

1977
Nations at the 1977 Southeast Asian Games